Jason Lee Jarrett (born 14 September 1979) is an English former footballer who played as a midfielder. He made 296 appearances in league and cup competitions in a 13-year career in the English Football League.

Jarrett started his career with Blackpool in 1998, the next year he moved on to Wrexham. He spent 2000 to 2002 with Bury, before signing with Wigan Athletic. In 2005, he joined Norwich City, moving on to Preston North End the next year. He spent the first part of 2009 with Brighton & Hove Albion after negotiating a release from his contract at Preston, he spent the later half of 2009 signed with Port Vale. In summer 2010 he signed with Oldham Athletic. He joined FC Halifax Town in July 2012, and moved on to Chester via Airbus UK Broughton in 2013. He moved on to Salford City in 2014, and helped the club to the Northern Premier League Division One North title in 2014–15.

Playing career
Jarrett started his career as an apprentice with Blackpool. He made his first-team debut in an FA Cup clash with Wigan Athletic on 14 November 1998 at Springfield Park, replacing Barry Shuttleworth late into a 4–3 defeat. He got his first start on 8 December, in a Football League Trophy 2–0 home defeat by Stoke City. He went on to play two league games that season, before joining Wrexham at the end of the season. On 9 October 1999, he played in a 5–1 defeat at Gillingham's Priestfield Stadium. That was his only appearances for the "Dragons".

He was with Bury for the 2000–01 season. He scored his first goal at Vetch Field, on 30 September 2000, scoring the second of a 2–0 win over Swansea City. In total he made 28 appearances that season. He established himself firmly in the first team in 2001–02, playing over forty games. Bury were relegated into the Third Division at the end of the season, but Jarrett avoided this fate, having been sold to Wigan Athletic for £75,000 in March 2002. He played 45 games in 2002–03, as Wigan were promoted from the Second Division as champions, with a massive 100 points. Coping well with First Division football, he made over forty appearances in 2003–04. His team finished two points outside the play-off places.

After recovering from a broken leg, he spent January 2005 with Stoke City. He played three games for the "Potters", including their 2–1 FA Cup defeat to Arsenal. Manager Tony Pulis was eager to have him back at the Britannia Stadium, but nothing came of the talk. The "Latics" finished second in 2004–05 and were promoted to the Premier League, though Jarrett only made fourteen appearances. Leaving the JJB Stadium after his contract was up, he rejected a new three-year deal with the Premier League club and instead chose to look for first-team football elsewhere, signing for Nigel Worthington's Norwich City in June 2005. He had already played under Worthington at Blackpool.

He was out of favour for the "Canaries" in 2005–06, playing just eleven league games. He joined Plymouth Argyle on a six-week loan in November 2005, who were managed by former Stoke boss Tony Pulis. He played seven games for the Devon-based club before returning to Norwich to help the club during an injury crisis. In March 2006, he joined Preston North End on loan until the end of the season, with a view to a permanent transfer afterwards. Norwich were paid £30,000 for the loan deal and the permanent transfer would go through for an undisclosed sum.

The 2006–07 season saw him play for three different clubs. Losing his place in the Preston side in September, he joined Hull City on loan in November 2006, to provide midfield cover for the injury-stricken club. In February 2007, he joined Leicester City on an initial one-month loan period. He made his debut in Leicester's 2–0 victory at Portman Road against Ipswich Town. On 23 February 2007, the loan was extended until the end of the season. He finished with thirteen appearances for the "Foxes" and would have joined the club permanently had manager Rob Kelly not lost his job. Back at Carrow Road, Jarrett was transfer listed at the end of the season. In October 2007 he was sent on loan to Queens Park Rangers for three months, but only played two games, returning to Deepdale after just a few weeks. He joined League One Oldham Athletic on an end-of-season loan in January 2008. He scored three times in fifteen games for the "Latics", including two in a 4–1 victory against Roses derby rivals Huddersfield Town, before also missing a penalty that would have completed a first career hat-trick.

After applying himself well in pre-season, he made three appearances for Preston in October 2008, but was told by manager Alan Irvine that he would be restricted to appearance from the bench at Deepdale. During his time at Preston he suffered with depression. In January 2009, Jarrett left Preston after negotiating an early release to his contract, and joined League One side Brighton & Hove Albion, signing a contract until the end of the 2008–09 season. Adams lost his job not long afterwards, and new manager Russell Slade brought in his own man in Gary Dicker from Stockport County. It was announced on 12 May 2009, that Jarrett would be leaving Brighton after the expiration of his contract at the end of June 2009.

In September 2009, he joined up with Micky Adams again, this time at League Two Port Vale on a trial basis. He was signed up on a three-month deal before the month was up, in an attempt to "kick-start his career". His first task was to regain the fitness necessary for regular football. However, he was not offered a new contract at the end of the year, having played just thirteen games, due to illness and injury. Adams admitted "the fans didn't see the best of him".

In July 2010 he signed a six-month contract with Oldham Athletic. Manager Paul Dickov spoke of how versatile the player was, and that he was planning to play the midfielder in defence, in the belief he can bring a lot of experience to a young side. He was released on 13 January 2011 after his short-term contract was completed, having made ten appearances. He spent July 2011 on trial at Rochdale.

He signed with Conference North club FC Halifax Town in July 2012. He moved on to Airbus in January 2013, and played ten Welsh Premier League games. He signed with Chester in May 2013. He made 32 appearances for the "Seals" as they were relegated out of the Conference Premier in 2013–14.

Jarrett signed with Salford City in June 2014. He made his club debut in the opening league match of the season on 16 August as Salford beat Scarborough 4–1. The "Ammies" won the Northern Premier League Division One North title in 2014–15.

Style of play
Brighton manager Micky Adams described Jarrett as "an energetic box-to-box midfielder who can operate in either an attacking or defensive role anywhere across the middle".

Later career
Jarrett took an FA refereeing course in 2013 at Lancashire FA, he continued to play semi-professional football whilst gaining experience refereeing on Sunday mornings in the Lancashire Sunday Football League. He made the decision to retire from playing football and concentrate on his refereeing career.

He set up a coaching academy named ProBall Sport.

Career statistics

Honours
Wigan Athletic
Football League Second Division: 2002–03
Championship second-place promotion: 2004–05

Salford City
Northern Premier League Division One North: 2014–15

References

1979 births
Living people
Footballers from Bury, Greater Manchester
English footballers
Association football midfielders
Blackpool F.C. players
Wrexham A.F.C. players
Bury F.C. players
Wigan Athletic F.C. players
Stoke City F.C. players
Norwich City F.C. players
Plymouth Argyle F.C. players
Preston North End F.C. players
Hull City A.F.C. players
Leicester City F.C. players
Queens Park Rangers F.C. players
Oldham Athletic A.F.C. players
Brighton & Hove Albion F.C. players
Port Vale F.C. players
FC Halifax Town players
Airbus UK Broughton F.C. players
Chester F.C. players
Salford City F.C. players
English Football League players
National League (English football) players
Cymru Premier players
Northern Football League players
English football referees